Dagsavisen is a daily newspaper published in Oslo, Norway. The former party organ of the Norwegian Labour Party, the ties loosened over time from 1975 to 1999. It has borne several names, and was called Arbeiderbladet from 1923 to 1997. Eirik Hoff Lysholm is editor-in-chief. The newspaper depends on economic support from the Norwegian Government.

History
Dagsavisen was established by Christian Holtermann Knudsen in 1884 under the name Vort Arbeide ('Our Work' in archaic Riksmål), and was affiliated with the trade union center Fagforeningernes Centralkomité. Holtermann Knudsen also had to establish his own printing press since the existing printing presses did not want to be affiliated with a labourer's newspaper. The fledgling project was marred by economic problems, and the burden of writing, editing, and printing lay chiefly on Knudsen. In 1885 the newly founded association Socialdemokratisk Forening formally took over the newspaper. The name was changed from Vort Arbeide to Social-Demokraten ('The Social Democrat') in 1886. The next year, the Norwegian Labour Party was founded, and Social-Demokraten became its official party organ. Carl Jeppesen took over as editor-in-chief. In 1894 the newspaper was published on a daily basis, and in 1904 the financial balance was positive.

Around 1920 there were tensions in the Labour Party. The radical wing spearheaded by Martin Tranmæl and Kyrre Grepp had assumed control over the party at the 1918 national convention. The party aligned itself with the Comintern. As a result, a moderate wing broke out in 1921 to form the Social Democratic Labour Party. Nonetheless, Social-Demokraten remained affiliated with the Labour Party, as Martin Tranmæl assumed the editorship in 1921. In 1923, the same year as the Labour Party renounced the Comintern and the communist wing broke away, Social-Demokraten changed its name to Arbeiderbladet (lit. 'The Worker Paper') in 1923. The factionalism was contrary to the goal of Christian Holtermann Knudsen, who wanted to unite the fledgling labour movement.

In 1940, upon the German invasion and subsequent occupation of Norway, Arbeiderbladet was stopped by the Nazi authorities. The only legal party in Norway during the occupation, Nasjonal Samling, evicted Arbeiderbladet from its premises, using it as headquarters for its party organ Fritt Folk. Arbeiderbladet's printing press was also utilized by Fritt Folk. Only in 1945, upon the liberation of Norway, did Arbeiderbladet resume publication.

Olav Larssen, imprisoned during the occupation, was promoted from news editor as he succeeded Martin Tranmæl as editor-in-chief in 1949. At that time, the editor-in-chief was elected by the national convention of the Labour Party, and the editor-in-chief was also an ex officio member of the party's central committee. This practice continued with editors-in-chief Reidar Hirsti and Einar Olsen, until abolished in 1975. From this point, the board of directors appointed the editor-in-chief.

In 1974, Tor and Trygve Bratteli, aided by Jens Chr. Hauge, forced Hirsti out of his job.

Arbeiderbladet was formally owned by the Labour Party until 1991, when a separate, but affiliated, entity Norsk Arbeiderpresse took over. The labour-inspired name Arbeiderbladet was changed in 1997, to the neutral Dagsavisen ('The Daily Newspaper'). In 1999 a step towards independence was taken, as the newspaper was published by the public company Dagsavisen AS, which is in turn was owned 100% by the foundation Stiftelsen Dagsavisen. As of 2016, this foundation only owns 9% of the shares of Dagsavisen directly, with the remaining 91% of the paper owned by Mentor Medier AS. This company also owns the Christian daily Vårt Land, and is partly owned by Christian groups such as Normisjon, Blå Kors and the Norwegian Lutheran Mission. The largest owner is Mushom Invest (10%). Stiftelsen Dagsavisen controls 6% of the shares in Mentor Medier AS.

The newspaper depends on economic support from the Norwegian Government.

Publishing
The newspaper changed to tabloid format in 1990, having used the Berliner format since 1976. In 1997 it launched its Internet version, and also started publishing on Sundays. The Sunday edition was discontinued in 2007 due to economic problems. It is widely accepted that Dagsavisen would face drastic problems if the distinctively Norwegian press support were to cease.

Dagsavisen is published six days a week.

Dagsavisen had a circulation of 28,337 in 2009, making it the fifth largest Oslo-based newspaper, after Verdens Gang, Aftenposten, Aften, Dagbladet and Dagens Næringsliv. It is also smaller than the regional and local newspapers Bergens Tidende, Adresseavisen, Stavanger Aftenblad, Fædrelandsvennen, Drammens Tidende, Romerikes Blad, Sunnmørsposten and Haugesunds Avis.

Its slogan is "Nyheter med mening" ('Meaningful news').

Editors-in-chief
Editors-in-chief of the newspaper:
1884–1886: Christian Holtermann Knudsen
1887–1891: Carl Jeppesen
1892–1893: Christian Holtermann Knudsen
1894–1897: Oscar Nissen
1898–1900: Ludvig Meyer
1900–1903: Anders Buen
1903–1906: Olav Kringen
1906–1912: Carl Jeppesen
1912–1918: Jacob Vidnes
1918–1921: Olaf Scheflo
1921–1940: Martin Tranmæl
1940–1945: stopped 
1945–1949: Martin Tranmæl
1949–1963: Olav Larssen
1963–1974: Reidar Hirsti
1974–1975: Einar Olsen
1975–1991: Per Brunvand
1991–1994: Arvid Jacobsen
1995–2000: Steinar Hansson
2001–2004: Hilde Haugsgjerd
2005–2009: Carsten Bleness
2009-2013: Arne Strand (At the time Strand left the position, the newspaper had two editors in chief)
2010-2014: Kaia Storvik (She held the position alone since 2013.)
2014- : Eirik Hoff Lysholm

Circulation
Source after 1950: The Norwegian Media Businesses' Association, Mediebedriftenes Landsforening.

 1884: 300
 1892: 1200
 1894: 3000
 1904: 6000
 1912: 15000
 1914: 23000
 1918: 40000
 1921: 85000
 1923: 35000
 1927: 27000
 1930: 34000
 1934: 48000
 1937: 59359
 1938: 58735
 1939: 58681
 ---
 1945: 80000
 1947: 56877
 1950: 62845
 1951: 64228
 1952: 65635
 1953: 64524
 1954: 65159
 1955: 65201
 1956: 70087
 1957: 71299
 1958: 68112
 1959: 66271
 1960: 67494
 1961: 67684
 1962: 67894
 1963: 69182
 1964: 67254
 1965: 68278
 1966: 67675
 1967: 70714
 1968: 71267
 1969: 74091
 1970: 73217
 1971: 75372
 1972: 69159
 1973: 64155
 1974: 61931
 1975: 62211
 1976: 60380
 1977: 60152
 1978: 60091
 1979: 59211
 1980: 55125
 1981: 52596
 1982: 52000
 1983: 52500
 1984: 56000
 1985: 57000
 1986: 58000
 1987: 60737
 1988: 57015
 1989: 55707
 1990: 51786
 1991: 47016
 1992: 44046
 1993: 43528
 1994: 42848
 1995: 42870
 1996: 42139
 1997: 40771
 1998: 43792
 1999: 40349
 2000: 38239
 2001: 35413
 2002: 33816
 2003: 32706
 2004: 32920
 2005: 33830
 2006: 32380 
 2007: 31403 
 2008: 29041 
 2009: 28337
 2014: 21945
 2015: 20497

See also
Moss Dagblad

References

External links
 Official website

1884 establishments in Norway
Labour Party (Norway) newspapers
Newspapers published in Oslo
Norwegian-language newspapers
Newspapers established in 1884
Socialist newspapers
Daily newspapers published in Norway